Gary McCaffrie is an Australian television comedy writer and producer, best known for his work on Fast Forward and Full Frontal, and his many collaborations with comedian Shaun Micallef. Most recently he was the creator and co-writer (with Wayne Hope) of Very Small Business (2008).

With Micallef, he created The Micallef Program, which ran for three award-winning seasons (1998-2001), and the BlackJack series of telemovies (2003-) starring Colin Friels. Gary has also contributed to Micallef's other TV projects, including Shaun Micallef's World Around Him (1996), Welcher & Welcher (2003), Micallef Tonight (2003) and Newstopia (2007-08). Among his other writing credits are The Games, skitHOUSE, Comedy Inc. and BackBerner.

Filmography

References

Australian television producers
Australian television writers
Living people
Year of birth missing (living people)
Australian male television writers